Cry is the second studio album by American ambient pop band Cigarettes After Sex, released through Partisan Records on October 25, 2019. It was preceded by the single "Heavenly".

Background
Frontman Greg Gonzalez said: "We made [Cry] to just be a snapshot of a moment, to capture the feeling of something. And it's flawed, but the fact that it's flawed means that it's an honest portrayal. And that's what is perfect about it to me." Gonzalez also remarked that he views the album as a "film" as it was "shot in this stunning, exotic location Mallorca, and it stitches all these different characters and scenes together, but in the end is really about romance, beauty & sexuality."

Elaborating on the band's style, Gonzalez said that after experiencing heartbreak, the music he needed was "very gentle" and "very peaceful, because internally I was going through such turmoil. The music that I make became a reaction to the life that happened."

Gonzalez wrote "Falling in Love" over two years. He states, "I wrote the chorus in the middle of a bunch of tours, very far from love or real relationships, and trying to write that song would've felt dishonest. By the time we got into the studio, I was seeing my current girlfriend and wrote from a real perspective. It felt very strange, in a way, to finally have that."

Critical reception

 Alisha Mughal of Exclaim! called the album a "gentler and more vulnerable" than the band's debut album, and writing that the album "will make you cry, because Gonzalez knows what he's doing. It's cathartic, stunning, it'll awaken your senses and it's not to be missed." On the other hand Timothy Monger of AllMusic stated that "for a project based on amorous and sensual pleasures, Cigarettes After Sex feels a little too one-dimensional".

Year-end rankings

Track listing

Personnel
Cigarettes After Sex
 Greg Gonzalez – vocals, guitar
 Randall Miller – bass
 Jacob Tomsky – drums
 Phillip Tubbs – keyboards

Production
 Greg Gonzalez – production
 Craig Silvey – mixing
 Max Prior – additional engineering
 Greg Calbi – mastering

Artwork
 Randall Miller – graphic design
 Donovan Brien – additional packaging design
 Alessandro Puccinelli – cover photo (Mare 345 – Seascape)

Charts

Weekly charts

Year-end charts

References

2019 albums
Cigarettes After Sex albums
Partisan Records albums